GP is an organophosphate nerve agent of the G-series, with a relatively slow rate of hydrolysis, and thus high stability and persistence in the environment.

References

G-series nerve agents
Acetylcholinesterase inhibitors
Methylphosphonofluoridates